Salah-Eddine Bounasr (born 27 September 1990) is a Moroccan long-distance runner.

Career 

In 2016, he won the Guangzhou Marathon with a time of 2:11:09.

In 2017, he became the first Moroccan athlete to win the Beijing Marathon.

In 2019, he won the Lake Biwa Marathon held in Ōtsu, Shiga, Japan with a new personal best of 2:07:52.

Achievements

References

External links 
 

Living people
1990 births
Place of birth missing (living people)
Moroccan male long-distance runners
Moroccan male marathon runners
20th-century Moroccan people
21st-century Moroccan people